Wilhelm Rammo (5 July 1925 – 1 August 2009) was a German boxer. He competed in the men's light middleweight event at the 1952 Summer Olympics, representing Saar.

References

External links
 

1925 births
2009 deaths
German male boxers
Olympic boxers of Saar
Boxers at the 1952 Summer Olympics
People from Neunkirchen (German district)
Light-middleweight boxers
Sportspeople from Saarland